Davidsen is a Scandinavian patronymic surname, meaning "son of David". There are alternate spellings, including those common in England, Wales, and Scotland: Davidson, Davisson, Davison, Daveson, and Davidsson. Davidsen may refer to:

Surname
 Agnethe Davidsen (1947-2007), mayor of Nuuk, Greenland
 Ingolf Davidsen (1893-1946), Norwegian gymnast who competed in the 1920 Summer Olympics
Jóhan Troest Davidsen (born 1988),  Faroese football player 
Leif Davidsen (born 1950), Danish author 
Mette Davidsen (born 1976), Norwegian team handball player 
 Vidar Davidsen (born 1958), Norwegian football coach

References

See also
 Davidsen (disambiguation)
 Davidson (name)

Danish-language surnames
Norwegian-language surnames
Patronymic surnames
Surnames from given names